Piano Solo is a solo album by Italian pianist Stefano Bollani recorded in 2005 and released on the ECM label.

Reception

The AllMusic review by Richard S. Ginell awarded the album 4 stars stating "Bollani can improvise on Prokofiev, trip along through a Dixieland standard... turn out splendidly intricate paraphrases... He also likes to make improbable associations... For the most part, all of this is filtered through a distinct, poetic, never flashy for its own sake, improvising personality, a lovely touch, and a concise sense of structure.".

Track listing
All compositions by Stefano Bollani except as indicated

 "Antonia" (Antonio Zambrini) – 4:52 
 "Impro I" – 3:12 
 "Impro II" – 3:05 
 "On a Theme by Sergey Prokofiev" – 5:27 
 "For All We Know" (J. Fred Coots, Sam M. Lewis) – 5:46 
 "Promenade" – 4:05 
 "Impro III" – 3:35 
 "A Media Luz" (Edgardo Donato, Carlos Cesar Lenzi) – 4:39 
 "Impro IV" – 3:43 
 "Buzzillare" – 3:11 
 "Do You Know What It Means to Miss New Orleans?" (Louis Alter, Eddie DeLange) – 4:36 
 "Cómo Fue" (Ernesto Duarte Brito) – 4:12 
 "On the Street Where You Live" (Alan Jay Lerner, Frederick Loewe) – 5:35 
 "Maple Leaf Rag" (Scott Joplin) – 2:37 
 "Sarcasmi" – 3:27 
 "Don't Talk (Put Your Head on My Shoulder)" (Tony Asher, Brian Wilson) – 6:18

Personnel
 Stefano Bollani — piano

References

ECM Records albums
Stefano Bollani albums
2006 albums
Albums produced by Manfred Eicher
Solo piano jazz albums